The following is a list of notable hotels in the Philippines.

Luzon
Thunderbird Resorts

Metro Manila

Visayas

Boracay
 Boracay Eco Village
 Hotel 101 Resorts-Boracay (proposed)

Cebu

Crown Regency Hotel and Towers
Maxwell Hotel Cebu
Shangri-La's Mactan Resort & Spa, Cebu
Waterfront Cebu City Hotel & Casino

Iloilo 

 Injap Tower Hotel

Mindanao

Cagayan de Oro
Maxandrea Hotel

Nationwide chains
Hotel Sogo

See also
 Tourism in the Philippines
 Lists of hotels

References

External links
 

 
 
Philippines